Hager Mountain is a volcanic peak in Oregon in the northwest corner of the Basin and Range Province in the United States.  The mountain is located south of the small unincorporated community of Silver Lake in south-central Oregon, and it is in the Fremont–Winema National Forest.  On the summit, there is a fire lookout operated during the summer and fall by the United States Forest Service.  There are several hiking trails that lead to the lookout station.

Geography and geology 

Hager Mountain is located on the edge of Oregon's high desert in the northwest corner of the Basin and Range Province of the western United States.

Hager Mountain is a large silicic lava dome structure that was formed approximately 5.9 million years ago. The mountain's primary rock is from the Hayes Butte Basalt flows. The eruptions that produced these flows came from a fault zone running southeast–northwest between Hager Mountain and Hayes Butte. The eruptions that created Hager Mountain released lava that flowed down the slopes of the volcanic dome onto plains around the mountain. The Hayes Butte Basalt overlays the Fort Rock Formation and earlier Picture Rock Basalt layers. All of these lava flows occurred during the Pliocene epoch. The Hayes Butte Basalt flows that form Hager occurred near the end of that epoch.

When exposed on the surface, Hayes Butte Basalt generally weathers into a thin and rocky soil. Today, Hager Mountain's soil is a loose, unconsolidated mix of fine alluvial particles, gravel, and a variety of larger rock fragments. Common surface rocks include basalt, andesite, pumice, and obsidian.

Environment and ecology 

Hager Mountain lies east of the Cascade Range in the northwestern corner of North America's basin and range environment. The areas north and east of the mountain are drier, typical high-desert country.

The middle and lower slopes of Hager Mountain are covered in a pine forest with an understory dominated by low sagebrush.  Other understory shrubs include curl-leaf mountain mahogany, and antelope bitterbrush.  Low groundcover plants include Indian paintbrush, yellow balsamroots, nineleaf biscuitroot, scabland fleabane, woolly sunflower, common yarrow, low pussytoes, and slender phlox.  Common grasses on the mountain include Idaho fescue, bluebunch wheatgrass, wild rye, prairie junegrass.  A few western junipers grow on the lower slopes on the northeast side of the mountain.

Hager Mountain and the surrounding area host a wide variety of wildlife.  Larger mammals found in the area include black-tailed deer, elk, coyotes, black bear, bobcats, and cougars.  Smaller mammals include American badgers, porcupines, striped skunks, black-tailed jackrabbits, white-tailed jackrabbits, pygmy rabbits, golden-mantled ground squirrels, and least chipmunks.

Forest birds common to the Hager Mountain area include mountain chickadee, Lazuli bunting, green-tailed towhee, MacGillivray's warbler, white-crowned sparrow, sage sparrow, black-headed grosbeak, Woodhouse's scrub jay, Pinyon jay, and black-billed magpie.  There are also at least three woodpecker species that live on or near Hager Mountain, including the black-backed woodpecker, white-headed woodpecker, and Lewis's woodpecker.  Larger birds found in the area include barn owls, great gray owls, great horned owls, red-tailed hawks, turkey vultures, golden eagles, and bald eagles.

History 

The Klamath people of south-central Oregon called the mountain Chock-chock-lisk-se, meaning "bald faced rock." Some early maps of the area show the mountain as Bald Mountain. However, early settlers called it Hagerhorst Mountain, after a pioneer rancher who lived just north of the mountain in the Silver Lake Valley. Over the years, the name was shortened to Hager.

The United States Forest Service built a fire lookout on Hager Mountain and began manning it full-time in 1915. The original lookout was replaced with a new structure in 1954. From it, the forest guard has a 360 degree view of the surrounding landscape. The Forest Service mans the lookout from June through October each year. There is a dirt road leading to the summit. The road is used only by the lookout on duty; it is not open to the public.

Recreation 

In the summer, recreation opportunities in the Hager Mountain area include hiking, horseback riding, mountain biking, bird watching, wildlife viewing, hunting, camping, and photography.  In the winter, cross-country skiing and snowshoeing are the most popular activities on Hager Mountain.  Weather conditions on the mountain can change rapidly, especially in the winter.  As a result, visitors enjoying winter activities need to check weather forecasts before setting out on any of the Hager Mountain trails.  

There are three day-hike trails that lead to the summit of Hager Mountain, in addition to the Fremont National Recreation Trail. The easiest trail is a  roundtrip from the road gate on the west side of the mountain. The second trail is a little more challenging. The route covers  each way. The trailhead is located on the northwest side of the mountain, just off Forest Road 012. The longest trail is an  roundtrip hike. The trailhead departs from Forest Road 28 near milepost 9 on the east side of the mountain. The two longer trails merge about halfway to the summit and then link to the Fremont National Recreation Trail a short distance later.

From the lookout station on the summit of Hager Mountain, visitors have an excellent view of Cascade peaks to the west as well as the high-desert country of northern Lake County to the north and east. Visitors can see as far north as Mount Hood and as far south as Mount Shasta from Hager's summit.

A Forest Service guard lives on-site at the Hager Mountain lookout during the summer wildfire season.  However, the public is able to visit the lookout during this period.  After the fire season is over, the lookout can be rented by the public for recreational purposes from November through May.  The lookout has a wood stove for heating the building, along with a propane cooking stove and a propane refrigerator.  There is a single bed and three sleeping cots.  Outside, there is a picnic table and an outhouse with a vault-type toilet.  There is no drinking water at the site.

See also 
List of mountains of Oregon

References

External links 
"Hager Mountain lookout". Fremont National Forest.
"Hager Mountain Lookout Recreation Rental".
 

Fire lookout towers in Oregon
Mountains of Lake County, Oregon
Landmarks in Oregon
Mountains of Oregon
Volcanoes of Oregon
Landforms of Lake County, Oregon